Peroni may refer to:

  (1874–1964), Italian musician and composer
  (born 1959), Italian journalist
 Geraldine Peroni (1953–2004), American film editor
 Giuseppe Peroni (1700–1776), Italian painter of the Baroque period
  (1930–2010), Italian prehistorian
  (born 1949), Italian actor and cabaret performer

Peroni may also refer to:
 Peroni Brewery, Italian brewing company now owned by Asahi Breweries of Japan
 Peroni S.p.A., Italian company manufacturing theater drapes and stage curtains